The mountain degu (Octodontomys gliroides) is a species of rodent in the family Octodontidae. It is the only species in the genus Octodontomys. It is found in the foothills of the Andes in Argentina, Bolivia and Chile.

Description
The hairs are long and silky. The upper surface is greyish-brown, the chin is pure white, and the underparts are white with a grey base to the hairs. There is a tuft of white hair in front of the large ears, which are clad in short grey hair. The slender tail is bi-coloured (dark above and pale below) and has a tuft of brown or ochre hairs at the tip. Juveniles have darker fur above and greyer underparts. Their tails are brownish with a dark brown or black tufted tip.

Distribution and habitat
This species is found in the mountainous areas of southwestern Bolivia, northwestern Argentina and northern Chile. The only species of octodontid found in the higher parts of its range, it inhabits dry rocky areas with tall cacti, shrubs and herbs.

Behaviour
The mountain degu is a mainly diurnal, herbivorous rodent. It does not have any special adaptations of skull or limbs for tunnelling but digs short burrows as well as living under rocks and in caves. Its tail can be autotomised and when climbing, it can be used as a prop. It is a sociable animal and communicates by means of a range of low, medium and high-pitched gurgles, twitters and squeaks. It feeds on the leaves and bark of shrubs, and on Acacia sheaths in the winter and on cactus fruits in the summer. It can obtain sufficient moisture from its food, particularly cactus, to satisfy its water requirements.

Little is known of the breeding habits of the mountain degu, but young in various stages of development have been found in November, and pregnant females and young in both January and May. A gestation period of around 105 days has been reported with a litter size of one to three pups. The pups are precocial when born, already having their eyes open and being well-furred.

Status
O. gliroides is listed as being of "least concern" by the International Union for Conservation of Nature because of its wide distribution, its presumed large population, its occurrence in some protected areas and apparent tolerance of some degree of habitat modification.

References

Mammals described in 1844
Mammals of Argentina
Mammals of Bolivia
Mammals of Chile
Mammals of the Andes
Octodontidae
Taxonomy articles created by Polbot
Taxa named by Paul Gervais
Taxa named by Alcide d'Orbigny